Vanuatu Association of Sports and National Olympic Committee (IOC code: VAN) is the National Olympic Committee representing Vanuatu.

See also
Vanuatu at the Olympics
Vanuatu at the Commonwealth Games

References 

Vanuatu